The Miraš open-cast coal mines are lignite coal mines in Kosovo operated by the Kosovo Energy Corporation (KEK).

Production 

Coal extraction has been developed in two coal mines, with a projected output target of 16.7 million tons of coal per year, not including the removal of 28 million cubic meters of overburden. The coal is mined by using a rotor excavator and transportation to the generating plants ("Kosovo A" and "Kosovo B") is on conveyor belts. Until the end of 1998, 226,260,825 tons of coal had been mined in Kosovo, representing 1.58% of the estimated geological deposits and 1.96% of the total exploitable reserves.

The projected production of this coal mine has been set at 8.6 million tons per year for coal, and 14 million m3 per year for overburden. In order to reach this target the equipment in the mines includes 11 bucket wheel excavators linked to automatic conveyor belt systems and four stacker spreaders. This same equipment has been in operation for the past 15–37 years.

Separation
Coal processing needs for KEK are carried out in two locations, close to two power plants "Kosovo A" and "Kosovo B". The separation plant in "Kosovo A" is spread out due to the various progressive phases of developments that have occurred, and is made up of the following facilities:

Separation "Kaltërt" ("Blue"), with annual capacity of 10 million tons
Grind Mill "Bardhi B", annual capacity of 5 million tons
Separation "Bardhi A", annual capacity of 5.5 million tons
Separation to sort Miraš, annual capacity of 2.4 million tons
Classic separation of Miraš, annual capacity of 3 million tons

Close to the "Kosovo B" power plant, there is a grinding mill and a warehouse specifically used for the needs of this power plant with an annual capacity of 6.5 million tons.

Drying Plant
This plant, used for the drying of wet coal, consists of two buildings: 
Drying Plant I, in operation since 1964
Drying Plant II, in operation since 1972

The capacity of both drying plants is sufficient for processing 1,200,000 tons of wet coal per year to produce 610,000 tons of dried coal. The original buildings are still being used despite the fact that they are 27–35 years old.

See also 
 Coal in Kosovo
 Natural resources of Kosovo

External links
 Kosovo Energy Corporation (Official website)

Coal mines in Kosovo
Surface mines in Kosovo